Wandtke is a surname. Notable people with the surname include:

Hanne Wandtke (born 1930), German contemporary dancer and choreographer
Igor Wandtke (born 1990), German judoka
Paul Wandtke (born 1985), American musician, songwriter and producer